George Monro may refer to:

 George Monro (British Army officer) (1700–1757), Scottish-Irish soldier
 George Monro (mayor) (1801–1878), businessman and political figure in Canada West
 George Monro (horticulturalist), 19th-century winner of the Victoria Medal of Honour

See also
 George Munro (disambiguation)